Delias eumolpe is a butterfly in the family Pieridae. It was described by Henley Grose-Smith in 1889. It is found in the Indomalayan realm. It is endemic to Borneo.

The wingspan is about 74–88 mm for males and 80–94 mm for females. Adults may be distinguished by the red submarginal spots on the hindwing verso.

Subspecies
Delias eumolpe eumolpe (northern Borneo)
Delias eumolpe masaeae Yagishita, 1993 (Mt Saran; Western Kalimantan)

References

External links
Delias at Markku Savela's Lepidoptera and Some Other Life Forms

eumolpe
Butterflies described in 1889